Glorian Hoxha (born 5 April 1994 in Lezhë) is an Albanian footballer who most recently played as an attacking midfielder for Kastrioti Krujë in the Albanian First Division, on loan from KF Tirana.

References

1994 births
Living people
People from Lezhë
Albanian footballers
KF Tirana players
KS Kastrioti players
Kategoria Superiore players
Kategoria e Parë players
Association football midfielders